Eurogate Zurich – originally HB-Südwest, later Stadtraum HB, and today as Europaallee (Europaallee Zurich) – is one of the urban developments on the southwest side of the Zurich Central Station, otherwise known as Zurich Hauptbahnhof, or Zurich HB. For decades, various commercial uses were discussed for above and next to this central-Zurich site owned by the Swiss Federal Railways (SBB/CFF/FFC).

History
The previous developments under the name HB-Südwest changed to the Eurogate projects with the entrance of a new investor in October 1996 - the major Swiss bank, UBS (UBS Fund Management AG, Basel).

Also at this time, the corporation HB-Südwest, which had been founded in March 1995 with the task of working through the overall project for HB-Südwest and the residential development for the Lagerstrasse in Zurich until start of construction, was renamed as Eurogate Zürich AG. With this change, the tasks were expanded to include the developing the entire project until completion.

Eurogate/HB-Südwest includes two major projects in Zurich:
 Development along Railway Tracks, Eurogate Zurich (Cost ca. 1.5billion Swiss Francs, planned since 1980)
 Residential Development along Lagerstrasse (Study 2000, 350 der 500 Wohnungen sowie Büro-, Gewerbe-, Freizeitflächen und Ersatzflächen für SBB-Anlagen)

The competition for the urban planning was won by the Zurich architectural office Ralph Bänziger Architekten. In the 1970s, Luigi Snozzi and Mario Botta had participated in the original competition with a design for a slender bridge-construction over the tracks, but their project was not further developed. Ralph Bänziger proposed a massive construction along the tracks.

The work on both designs and the many changes to the project lasted from 1980 until 2001.

External links 
 Website for the project: Europaallee. Ein neuer Stadtteil entsteht.

Buildings and structures in Zürich